Queuñamolloco (possibly from Aymara qiwña polylepis, mulluq'u round, round head and swirl) is a mountain in the Andes of Peru, about  high. It is located in the Puno Region, El Collao Province, Santa Rosa District. It lies northeast of Quinaquinani and southeast of Pacocahua.

References

Mountains of Puno Region
Mountains of Peru